Highview Power is a long-duration energy storage pioneer, specialising in cryogenic energy storage. It is based in the United Kingdom, and formerly the United States. It has permission for a commercial-scale 50 Megawatt/250 Megawatt-hour plant in England, building upon its earlier 5 Megawatt and 350 Kilowatt pilot plants. It had plans to develop a 50MW plant/400MWh (eight hours of storage) in Vermont.

It has over 30 patents developed in partnership with British universities and has won technology funding from the British Government.

In February 2020 Sumitomo Heavy Industries invested $46m in the company.

in September 2021, it was announced that Adrian Katzew would become the new CEO, though this didn't come to pass.

In 2022, it closed its offices in the United States.

Technology
Its CRYOBattery™ technology uses low-cost electricity to cool air to -196 °C, reducing it to a liquid 1/700th the volume. At times of high demand for electricity, when prices are typically high, the liquid is expanded through a turbine to generate electricity, free of combustion and the resultant emissions. The process can utilise waste heat and waste cold to boost efficiency. The system utilises standard equipment from sectors like Liquified Natural Gas and, unlike short-duration energy storage technologies (like thermochemical batteries), doesn't require mining for, or complex recycling of, rare minerals.

Awards
 Ashden Award for Energy Innovation
 Global Frost & Sullivan Award for Technology Innovation
 The Engineer Innovation Award

Partners

Academic
 Centre for Cryogenic Energy Storage, University of Birmingham
 University of Brighton
 University of Leeds

Industry
 BOC
 Citec
 GE
 Linde
 Messer
 Tenaska
 Viridor

See also
 Cryogenic energy storage

References

External links
 highviewpower.com

Energy storage
Cryogenics